Hatsuharu may refer to:

 , an Asakaze-class Imperial Japanese Navy destroyer launched in 1906 that saw service in World War I and was stricken in 1925
 , an Imperial Japanese Navy destroyer launched and commissioned in 1933 which saw action in World War II and was sunk in 1944
 , a class of Imperial Japanese Navy destroyers built between 1931 and 1935 which saw service in World War II

Japanese Navy ship names
Imperial Japanese Navy ship names